Kylie Dowling (born 1974) is an Australian Polocrosse rider. Dowling competed for many years, and retired in 2008.  She rode in Australia's winning team 2007 in the United Kingdom at the Polocrosse World Cup.  In 2008, Dowling also won Best Number 1 Women's Rider at the Polocrosse Nationals in Perth.  Dowling's most successful horse was Kebarinup Lisa.

She was born in Western Australia.

Career 
2001 Great Southern Zone Polocrosse Women's Winner
2001 great southern zone Polocrosse Women's R/U in Australian champs.
2000 WA Women's Polocrosse Naracoorte.
1999 WA Vs Zimbabwe mixed Polocrosse.
1998 WA Women's Polocrosse
Won Aust Zone Championships.

See also
Women's sport in Australia

References

External links
Polocrosse Worldwide Article
2008 Polocrosse Nationals Results

Living people
1974 births
Sportswomen from Western Australia